Bilal Abdallah Alayli is a Lebanese academic and scholar.

Early life
Bilal Alayli Or Alayeli (:ar: بلال عبد الله العلايلي) was born in Beirut, Lebanon in 1949. He was raised in a Sunni Muslim family.

Educational background

Undergraduate studies
He joined the Lebanese University to graduate in 1973 earning a bachelor's degree in physics.  His highest honors qualified him to earn the scholarship of the Lebanese University to travel to France for further academic formation.

Graduate studies
In France, he obtained a PhD in nuclear physics from the University of Lyon in 1976 and received his diploma in civil engineering from (École centrale de Lyon).

Academic work
He joined the University of Oran (Algeria) from the year of 1976 until the year of 1979.  He founded with Dr. Jack Nasr Faculty of Engineering at the Lebanese University in 1981. He was appointed Director of the Faculty of Engineering at the Lebanese University -section III through the years of 1982 and 1992.  He remained a Professor in that university until the year of 2007.

Professional experience
He worked as an Assistant Director of Oger from 1982 until 1984
He was appointed Assistant Director of the Hariri Foundation from 1984 until 1986
Co- founder of laceco

In the Order of Engineers and Architects – Beirut
Elected as the president of the Order of Engineers and Architects in April 2008 supported by the Future Movement (almustaqbal) and 14 March. His number at The Order of Engineers and Architects – Beirut is 4173.

External links
 Laceco The Team
 universite of lyon
 visit of Bilal Alaily Director of Operations, Ghassan Khatib Director of LACECO to Chairman and Founder of Adgeco Group Mohamed Dekkak 
 Visit of a delegation from the FSCE to the President of the Order of Engineers of Beirut

References

1949 births
Living people
Businesspeople from Beirut
Lebanese Sunni Muslims
Lebanese University alumni
University of Lyon alumni
Academic staff of Lebanese University